Wallingford Museum is a museum with collections of local interest, housed in a Tudor house in High Street, Wallingford, Oxfordshire (formerly Berkshire).

The museum has an extensive collection relating to the town's history. Displays include archaeology, Wallingford Castle, and the town in medieval and Victorian times. A free audio tour is available.

The museum is in a mid-16th-century timber-framed house with a 17th-century flint façade. It faces the Kinecroft, an open space in Wallingford which is bordered on two sides by Anglo-Saxon burh defences built in the 9th century.

The Museum, which is fully accredited, is run entirely by volunteers. Wallingford Museum is an independent charitable company registered in England & Wales.

External links

Wallingford Museum

Houses completed in the 16th century
Archaeological museums in England
Charities based in Oxfordshire
History of Berkshire
Houses in Oxfordshire
Local museums in Oxfordshire
Museums in Oxfordshire
Timber framed buildings in England
Tudor architecture
Wallingford, Oxfordshire